The 1984 Limerick Senior Hurling Championship was the 90th staging of the Limerick Senior Hurling Championship since its establishment by the Limerick County Board.

Patrickswell were the defending champions.

On 14 October 1984, Patrickswell won the championship after a 4-13 to 3-05 defeat of Cappamore in the final. It was their ninth championship title overall and their third title in succession.

Results

Final

References

Limerick Senior Hurling Championship
Limerick Senior Hurling Championship